Caiolo (Lombard: Cajööl) is a comune (municipality) in the Province of Sondrio in the Italian region Lombardy, located about  northeast of Milan and about  southwest of Sondrio.

Caiolo borders the following municipalities: Albosaggia, Carona, Castione Andevenno, Cedrasco, Foppolo, Piateda, Postalesio, Sondrio.

The church of San Vittore has Renaissance frescoes by Vincenzo De Barberis.

Demographic evolution

References

External links
 www.comune.caiolo.so.it

Cities and towns in Lombardy